The smallhead stickleback (Gasterosteus microcephalus), or resident threespined stickleback, is a fish species, which widespread in the basin of the Pacific Ocean: Japan, also Mexico. Freshwater demersal fish, up to  length. Habits small streams, where feeds on aquatic insects and other invertebrates. This taxon is regarded by some authorities as a synonym of the three-spined stickleback (G. aculeatus), and others treat it as a subspecies of the three-spined stickleback, G. a. microcephalus.

References

Gasterosteus
Fish of Japan
Fish of Mexican Pacific coast
Fish described in 1854